
Year 301 (CCCI) was a common year starting on Wednesday (link will display the full calendar) of the Julian calendar. At the time, it was known as the Year of the Consulship of Postumius and Nepotianus (or, less frequently, year 1054 Ab urbe condita). The denomination 301 for this year has been used since the early medieval period, when the Anno Domini calendar era became the prevalent method in Europe for naming years.

Events 
 By place 
 Roman Empire 
 Caesar Galerius begins a major war against the Carpi and Bastarnae and wins the first of several victories.
 September: Emperor Diocletian issues a reform that revalues the Roman currency.
 November: Diocletian issues his Edict on Maximum Prices, which, rather than halting rampant inflation, causes widespread panic and an increase in inflation. The measure is quickly abandoned.

 Armenia 
 King Tiridates III (the Great) proclaims Christianity as the official state religion, making Armenia the first nation to adopt Christianity as its official religion (traditional date).CNEWA.org Construction of the original Etchmiadzin Cathedral by Gregory the Illuminator begins.

 Europe 
 September 3 – The republic of San Marino is established (approximate date).

 Asia 
 February 3 – May 30 – Sima Lun briefly usurps the Jin Dynasty.

Births 
 Xie Ai, Chinese general of the Former Liang state (d. 354)

Deaths 
 June 5 – Sima Lun, Chinese usurper (forced suicide)
 Sun Xiu (or Junzhong), Chinese official and politician

References